Tzvi Hirsch ben Yaakov Ashkenazi (1656 – May 2, 1718), known as the Chacham Tzvi after his responsa by the same title, served for some time as rabbi of Amsterdam. He was a resolute opponent of the followers of the false messiah, Sabbatai Zevi. He had a chequered career owing to his independence of character. He visited many lands, including England, where he wielded much influence. His responsa are held in high esteem.

Early life and education
Ashkenazi was born in 1656 in Moravia, most likely in Gross Meseritsch where his father Jacob Wilner was active. He was descended from a well-known family of scholars, a grandson of Ephraim ha-Kohen who in turn was the son-in-law of a grandchild of Elijah Ba'al Shem of Chelm. He spent most his childhood in Alt-Ofen (now Budapest) where his grandfather served as rabbi. Tutored by his father and grandfather, he later went to Salonica where he attended the school of Eliyahu Kovo and devoted himself to an investigation of the Sephardic methods of study. He also witnessed the impact of the Sabbatai Zevi movement on the community, an experience which significantly influenced his career. Upon his return journey he seems to have stayed some time (probably till 1679) at Constantinople where his learning and astuteness made such an impression he became known by the Sephardic title for rabbi, "Chacham", an honorific he retained throughout his life. Shortly after his return to Alt-Ofen he married into a prominent  and wealthy local family.

Germany
In 1686 Alt-Ofen was invaded by the Austrian army, and Ashkenazi's young wife and his daughter were killed by a cannon-shot. He fled, becoming separated from his parents (who were taken captive by the Prussians), and proceeded to Sarajevo, where he received an appointment as rabbi. He remained in that city until 1689, in which year he resigned (probably on account of some contention with certain members of his congregation), and left for Germany. In Berlin he married Sarah (died at Lemberg January 23, 1719), the daughter of Meshullam Zalman Mirels Neumark, chief rabbi of Altona, Hamburg, and Wandsbek.

On the advice of his father-in-law he went in 1690 to Altona, where the leading members of the congregation founded a study-house (Klaus) and installed Ashkenazi as rabbi. His yeshiva became celebrated, and pupils assembled from all parts to hear him; but his income as rabbi of the Klaus was only 60 thalers annually, so that he was compelled to defray his living expenses by engaging in various business pursuits (e.g. dealing in jewelry). After the death of his father-in-law, whom Ashkenazi had latterly aided in his official duties, one party in the Jewish community wished to have Ashkenazi installed as rabbi of the three congregations (the unity known as AH"U), while another party favored the election of Moses ben Alexander Rothenburg. Finally it was decided that both candidates should serve, but alternately, each for a period of six months. Friction and strife over religious questions ensued, and finally became so intense that, in 1709, Ashkenazi deemed it advisable to resign and resume his duties as rabbi of the Klaus.

Amsterdam

Appointment and welcome
Less than a year later, on 10 January 1710, he received a letter of appointment to the chief rabbinate of the Ashkenazi congregation of Amsterdam. In addition to free residence, the office carried with it a yearly salary of 2,500 Dutch guilders (a large sum, in view of the fact that fifty years later 375 guilders was the usual salary of the chief rabbi of Berlin). Unselfish and independent by nature, Ashkenazi renounced the perquisites of his office, such as fees in civil suits, in order to maintain his independence, and accepted the high position only upon the condition that under no circumstances was he to be required to subordinate himself to the congregation, or to be obliged to receive gifts, and that he should be permitted to preserve absolute freedom of action on all occasions.

From the very beginning he encountered in Amsterdam a hostile party, whose principal leader was Aaron Polak Gokkes. Indeed, the difficulties with the directors became so serious that, on 26 May 1712, it was decided to dismiss the chief rabbi at the end of the term (three years) mentioned in his letter of appointment. Ashkenazi announced that he would not under any circumstances accept this dismissal, which he regarded as unjust. Serious difficulties arose. The rabbi's salary does not seem to have been paid, for in the register of the records of the congregation it is stated that on Saturday 4 Nisan 5472 (12 April 1712), the parnasim sent a secretary and two attendants of the congregation to Ashkenazi to inform the latter that upon the return of the letter of appointment he would be paid the money to which he was still entitled. Ashkenazi, however, naturally declined to return this piece of evidence, a copy of which has been preserved among the official documents of the congregation.

The Chayun incident
On June 30, 1713, Nehemiah Chiya Chayun arrived at Amsterdam and requested permission of the Portuguese congregation to circulate his writings, which had been published at Berlin. Ashkenazi thought Chayun was an old enemy of his from Sarajevo and Salonica, and at once requested Solomon Ayllon, Chacham of the Portuguese congregation, not to accord patronage to the stranger, who was unfavorably known to him. Ashkenazi believed himself justified in making this demand, as the Portuguese congregation and its rabbi had, from the beginning, treated him most courteously, and had already, during his term at Altona, repeatedly sent to him from the Sephardim of Hamburg, Amsterdam, and London religio-legal questions for his decision. Chayun thereupon called on Ashkenazi personally and made an explanation; whereupon the rabbi retracted his accusation, stating that it was a case of mistaken identity. Meanwhile, several members of the Portuguese congregation had submitted Chayun's writings to the judgment of Moses Hagiz, a messenger from Jerusalem then sojourning at Amsterdam, who immediately discovered their Sabbatian principles and tendencies and gave the alarm. He also called the attention of Ashkenazi to the dangerous doctrines published in Chayun's book, whereupon the rabbi again warned the directorate of the Sephardim congregation not to support the author. Ashkenazi rejected a proposition to designate the objectionable passages, and declined to act as member of a committee of investigation, because he did not regard Ayllon, the rabbi of the Sephardim, as a competent authority on such questions. Thereupon a fierce contention ensued, during the progress of which Hagiz fought valiantly beside Ashkenazi.

A great number of pamphlets were issued by both sides, in which the contestants indulged in the most vehement abuse of each other. On 23 July 1713, Ashkenazi placed Chayun under the ban, because the investigating committee appointed by the Sephardic directorate had not yet made its report. In consequence of this measure, both Ashkenazi and Chagiz were subjected to street attacks, more particularly at the hands of the Portuguese, who threatened to kill them. In the midst of the constantly increasing bitterness and animosity, the report of the committee, which had been prepared by Ayllon alone, was publicly announced. It was to the effect that the writings of Chayun contained nothing which could be construed as offensive to Judaism. It was publicly announced in the synagogue that Chayun was to be exonerated from every suspicion of heresy, and on the following day a public reception was tendered him at the synagogue, on which occasion unparalleled honor was shown him. Naturally, the Sephardic opponents of Ashkenazi had found excellent support among the rabbi's adversaries in his own German congregation. The controversy was now waged so fiercely that even the family-life of the community became affected, and all peace vanished from the otherwise model congregation of Amsterdam. Ashkenazi was deserted, except for a few friends that remained faithful to him. When, finally, he was summoned by the directors of the Portuguese congregation to appear before their tribunal—which, of course, had no jurisdiction—he refused to do so, as he anticipated that he would be asked to retract and to praise and recommend Chayun.

Placed under ban
Through a Christian advocate the directorate again summoned Ashkenazi to appear, 9 November 1713, and when he again refused, he and Moses Hagiz were formally placed under the ban by the Portuguese community. Ashkenazi was temporarily placed under arrest in his own home (probably to protect his life) by the municipal authorities, who had been influenced against him by Ayllon and the Portuguese leaders; and the whole matter was brought before the magistracy in order to secure Ashkenazi's deposition and banishment from Amsterdam.

The magistrates thereupon sought the opinions of certain professors at Leiden, Utrecht, and Harderwijk, including Willem Surenhuis and Adriaan Reland, on the dispute; but their decision, if given, has not been made known.

London
Ashkenazi forestalled the magisterial action by resigning his office and fleeing, in the beginning of 1714, from Amsterdam, perhaps secretly, with the aid of his friend Solomon Levi Norden Lima. After leaving his wife and children at Emden, he proceeded to London at the invitation of the Sephardic congregation of that city. In 1705 he was invited to pronounce a judicial decision concerning the orthodoxy of the rabbi David Nieto, who, in a certain sermon, had given utterance to allegedly Spinozistic views. In London Ashkenazi found many friends, and received many tributes of regard. Even before this he had been invited to take the rabbinate of the Sephardic congregation, but refused. It seems that his portrait in oil was painted here, after he had refused, on account of religious scruples, to have his bust stamped on a coin. In the following spring he returned to Emden, and proceeded thence to Poland by way of Hanover, Halberstadt, Berlin, and Breslau, stopping at each place for some time. After spending two years in Staszów, Poland, he was called to Hamburg to serve as member of a judicial body convened to settle a complicated legal question.

Upon the death of Simhah Cohen Rapoport, in 1717, Ashkenazi was called as rabbi to Lemberg, where he stood in high repute, both in his congregation and in the community at large. Four months after entering upon this office, he died.

Praised by contemporaries
Of a firm and unselfish but abrupt and passionate disposition, Ashkenazi everywhere aroused the discontent and hatred of the rich and the scholarly. Extensive learning, keen intelligence, and exceptional linguistic attainments, all combined to make him one of the most distinguished men of his day. All his contemporaries, even those who knew him only as the head of the Klaus at Altona, unite in praising his profound learning, his astuteness, his clearness of exposition, which never degenerated into the subtleties of the pilpul, and his absolute disregard for the influence of money. He would suffer serious deprivation rather than accept pecuniary assistance; and this characteristic, interpreted by the wealthy of that day as obstinacy and arrogance, became to him a source of much suffering and enmity.

Of his works, only a part of his responsa have been printed, under the title "Responsa Chacham Tzvi" (Amsterdam, 1712, and since frequently republished). They are distinguished by lucidity of treatment and an undeviating adherence to the subject.

Descendants
His son Jacob served as rabbi in Emden and followed in his father's footsteps in combating inroads of the Sabbattean movement. His daughter Miriam was the wife of Aryeh Leib ben Saul, the rabbi of Amsterdam; the mother of Chief Rabbi Hart Lyon; and the grandmother of the first chief rabbi of the British empire, Solomon Heschel. Ashkenazi's son David was the Av Beit Din of Novyy Yarychev, Ukraine, and an ancestor of the mother of Rabbi Chaim Halberstam (the Divrei Chaim), Miriam. (See Dr. Neil Rosenstein's The Unbroken Chain for details about conflicting opinions as to how Miriam was a descendant of David.) His grandson, Meshullam Solomon, was one of the two opposing chief rabbis of the United Kingdom and the rabbi of the Hambro' Synagogue in London.

Rabbi Yaakov Lorberbaum (Yaakov ben Yaakov Moshe Lorberbaum of Lissa) (1760-1832) (known in English as Jacob ben Jacob Moses of Lissa, Jacob Lorberbaum or Jacob Lisser) was the great-grandson of Tzvi Ashkenazi.

Jewish Encyclopedia bibliography

Buber, Anshe Shem, pp. 187–192;
Kaufmann, in Transactions of the Jewish Historical Society of England, iii. 102 et seq.;
Grätz, Gesch. der Juden, x. 352 et seq. and note 6;
Jacob Emden, Torat ha-Kenaoth;
idem, Megillat Sefer;
H. A. Wagenaar, beginning of Toledot Ya'bez;
J. M. Schütz, appendix to Maẓebet Ḳodesh;
Haim Nathan Dembitzer, Kelilat Yofi, i. 91 et seq.;
Fuenn, Kiryah Neëmanah, pp. 86 et seq.;
Mulder, in Nederlandsch-Israelietisch Jaarboekje, 5620, pp. 42 et seq.;
idem, Iets over de Begraafplaatsen, No. 18, p. 17;
inscriptions on the tombstones of two of Ashkenazi's children, who died in 1712-1713.

References

External links

Responsa Chacham Tzvi
Yetziv Pisgam - Eulogy from Jacob Emden on the Chacham Tzvi

1656 births
1718 deaths
18th-century English rabbis
17th-century Bohemian rabbis
Czech Orthodox rabbis
Czech expatriates in Hungary
Czech expatriates in the Netherlands
Rabbis from Amsterdam
17th-century German rabbis
Rabbis from London
People from Moravia
People from Velké Meziříčí
Authors of books on Jewish law
17th-century rabbis from the Ottoman Empire
18th-century Dutch rabbis